Hattar railway station is located in Hattar, Khyber Pakhtunkhwa, Pakistan.

See also
 List of railway stations in Pakistan
 Pakistan Railways

References

External links

Railway stations in Haripur District